Antigastra is a genus of moths of the family Crambidae.

Species
Antigastra catalaunalis (Duponchel, 1833)
Antigastra longipalpis Swinhoe, 1894
Antigastra morysalis (Walker, 1859)

References

Spilomelinae
Crambidae genera
Taxa named by Julius Lederer